Collide is an American industrial music duo formed in Los Angeles in 1992, that has incorporated elements of trip hop, synthpop and music from the Middle East into their sound.

The name comes from the 'collision' of musical styles, primarily the ethereal vocals provided by kaRIN and the electronic music provided by Statik. Collide's debut album, Beneath the Skin, was released in 1996, followed by a remix album, Distort, in 1998 containing remixes by artists such as Kneel Cohn of the bands Spirits In Sin and The Dead Stars On Hollywood.   Dissatisfied with the music industry, Collide started their own record label, Noiseplus Music, and in 2000, they released their second studio album, Chasing the Ghost. It was pressed in limited quantity cassette tape and all track versions are different from those on later releases. Songs on side two of the album remain unreleased elsewhere.

Three years later, they released their third studio album, Some Kind of Strange. The following year, the band released another remix album, Vortex, containing remixes by numerous remix artists, including Charlie Clouser. Joining kaRIN and Statik this time around, and for their first live performances a little later in the year, were Scott Landes (guitar), Rogerio Silva (guitar), Chaz Pease (drums), and Kai Kurosawa (Warr guitars/bass).

In 2005, Collide released a DVD, entitled Like the Hunted, along with a live CD. Then they recorded with Curve's Dean Garcia in a project called The Secret Meeting. The album, Ultrashiver, was released under their Noiseplus label on June 26, 2007.  On September 23, 2008, the band released their fourth studio album Two Headed Monster.  Special guests on the album included Danny Carey from Tool and Dean Garcia from Curve.

At Halloween 2009, the album These Eyes Before was released. It was a 10-song album of cover versions of well-known songs by artists such as The Beatles, Depeche Mode, Radiohead, and Pink Floyd. Currently, they are offering a free song in exchange for donations which will go towards the recording of a new album.

In January 2011, Collide was nominated for The 10th Annual Independent Music Awards under the Cover Song category for "The Lunatics Have Taken Over the Asylum".

Members

Full time members 
kaRIN – vocals, lyrics
Statik – music, production

Live members 
Scott Landes – guitars
Rogerio Silva – guitars
Chaz Pease – drums
Kai Kurosawa – Warr Guitar/bass

Discography 
Studio albums
 ...The Crimson Trial (1994, Noiseplus)
 Beneath the Skin (1996, Re-Constriction)
 Chasing the Ghost (2000, Noiseplus)
 Some Kind of Strange (2003, Noiseplus)
 Two Headed Monster (2008, Noiseplus)
 These Eyes Before (2009, Noiseplus)
 Counting to Zero (2011, Noiseplus)
 Color of Nothing (2017, Noiseplus)
 Mind & Matter (2018, Noiseplus)
 Notes From the Universe (2022, Noiseplus)

Extended Plays
 Skin (1996, Nightshade)
 Deep/Violet's Dance (1997, Re-Constriction)
 Not Forgotten (2008, Noiseplus)

Live albums
 Live at The El Rey (2005, Noiseplus)

Compilation albums
 Distort (1998, Re-Constriction)
 Vortex (2004, Noiseplus)
 Bent and Broken (2012, Noiseplus)
 Best of Collide (2013, Noiseplus)

Releases with Dean Garcia/The Secret Meeting

References

External links 
 
 
 
 
 

Trip hop groups
Musical groups established in 1992
American dark wave musical groups
American industrial music groups
Musical groups from Los Angeles
Re-Constriction Records artists